Xavier "Xavi" Capdevila Romero (born 17 July 1976) from Escaldes-Engordany is an Andorran ski mountaineer.

Capdevila was born in Canillo. He started ski mountaineering in 1998 and competed first in the (La) Serrera race in the same year. 

He is a professional firefighter, and is married to Neus Tort Gendrau.

Selected results
 2004:
 8th, World Championship relay race (together with Joan Vilana Díaz, Manel Pelegrina Lopez and Toni Casals Rueda)
 2005:
 1st, Circuit Català Pro-Olímpic
 1st, Snow Top Andorra
 7th, European Championship relay race (together with Toni Casals Rueda, Xavier Comas Guixé and Joan Vilana Díaz)
 2006:
 8th, World Championship relay race (together with Toni Casals Rueda, Joan Albós Cavaliere and Joan Vilana Díaz)
 2007:
 7th, European Championship relay race (together with Toni Casals Rueda, Joan Albós Cavaliere and Xavier Comas Guixé)
 2008:
 8th, World Championship relay race (together with Xavier Comas Guixé, Joan Vilana Díaz and Joan Albós Cavaliere)
 2009:
 6th, European Championship relay race (together with Toni Casals Rueda, Joan Albós Cavaliere and Joan Vilana Díaz)

External links
 Xavier Capdevila Romero at Skimountaineering.org

References 

1976 births
Living people
Andorran male ski mountaineers
People from Escaldes-Engordany